was a JR East railway station located in Ōfunato, Iwate Prefecture, Japan. The station was destroyed by the 2011 Tōhoku earthquake and tsunami and has now been replaced by a provisional bus rapid transit line.

Lines
Ōfunato Station was served by the Ōfunato Line, and was located 103.1 rail kilometers from the terminus of the line at Ichinoseki Station.

Station layout
Ōfunato Station had a single side platform serving traffic in both directions.

History
Ōfunato Station opened on 3 September 1934. The station was absorbed into the JR East network upon the privatization of the Japan National Railways (JNR) on April 1, 1987. The station was destroyed by the 11 March 2011 Tōhoku earthquake and tsunami.

Surrounding area
  National Route 45
Ōfunato Port

External links

 East Station information 

Railway stations in Iwate Prefecture
Ōfunato Line
Railway stations in Japan opened in 1934
Railway stations closed in 2011